The Johns Hopkins Blue Jays football team represents Johns Hopkins University in the sport of American football. The Blue Jays compete in Division III of the National Collegiate Athletic Association (NCAA) as members of the Centennial Conference. Johns Hopkins has fielded a team since 1882. Johns Hopkins has won or shared 13 Centennial Conference titles since the 2002 season, including 10 straight titles through the 2018 season.

History
Hopkins' first team was assembled in 1881, and spent an entire year training and learning a version of the game. Their sport, which was closer to rugby, was played in Druid Hill Park. After the training, the team planned a two-game 1882 season. The squad had to play the season under the title of the Clifton Athletic Club, due to the school's policy on the sport of football. The first was a practice game with the Baltimore Athletic Club, played on October 7. The Hopkins team lost the contest 4–0. The following game was their first true game, to be played against the Naval Academy.

Seasons 

 D3Football.com rankings are available from 2003.
 Coaches' Poll started to be released in 1999.
 If there is a discrepancy, the school's official records are in parentheses.
 Blue Jays football team played in two conferences, the MAC South and the Mason–Dixon Conference from 1958 to 1974 season.

Playoff appearances

NCAA Division III
The Blue Jays have appeared in the Division III playoffs eleven times, with an overall record of 10–10.

Notable players

Bill Stromberg earned a B.A. from Hopkins in 1982 and became one of the most decorated athletes in the history of Johns Hopkins, making him "arguably the best football player in Johns Hopkins history." He is considered one of the best wide receivers in NCAA Division III history as the holder of six national and 13 school records. Stromberg was inducted into the Johns Hopkins Hall of Fame and then elected to the College Football Hall of Fame in 2004, and was, as of 2017, the only Hopkins football player to be inducted there. Hopkins constructed a new baseball field and athletic facilities which was named Stromberg Stadium in 2014 in his honor.

After graduation, Stromberg signed as a free agent with the Philadelphia Eagles, played a few preseason games before pulling a hamstring, and was ultimately cut before the 1982 season began. He became the CEO of Baltimore-based asset management firm T. Rowe Price in 2016.

Wide Receiver Joe Cowan was drafted by the Baltimore Colts in 1969.

References

External links  
 Centennial Conference football History & Records
 Johns Hopkins Blue Jays football Record Book (As of December 7, 2022)

 
American football teams established in 1882
1882 establishments in Maryland